Get to the Boat is the debut studio EP from the American rock band Yawn Mower, released in May 2016.

Content
The five-track EP was self-released on compact disc and digital download, on May 5, 2016. It was recorded by Paul Ritchie at Insidious Sound in Neptune City, New Jersey, and mastered by Pat Noon at Eightsixteen Studios in South River, New Jersey. The album photography is by Michael Burke and layout by Michael Loupos. Jenn Fantaccione plays cello on "Convenience Store." Get to the Boat is noted for its punk influences, and is described as "a sardonic statement on the banality of existence." In a 2017 interview with The Pop Break, Yawn Mower expains the album "was our first proper release, so I feel like we spent more time on that one. We stepped away from sessions to let the ideas simmer."

Reception
A review by John Pfeiffer in The Aquarian Weekly says "Mike and Biff tear through their compositional angst with the panache of anything Kurt Cobain and the boys could have ever done. I especially admire their rhythmic delivery and overall attitude for their craft. Bob Makin of Courier News  calls Get on the Boat "fantastic" and an "underground opus." He closes the review saying "defiantly sharp artistic observers who chisel and scrape with the dull edge of lo-fi rock, this duo will be enjoyed by anyone who refuses to submit to the power elite's dead-end demand for dutiful, unimaginative workers and consumers."

Track listing

Personnel
Mike Chick – vocals and baritone guitar
Biff Swenson – drums, percussion and vocals

Additional musicians
Jenn Fantaccione – cello on "Convenience Store"

References
Citations

Bibliography

Indie rock EPs

2016 debut EPs